Volcanoes of the World is a book that was published in three editions in 1981, 1994, and 2010 as a collaboration between volcanologists around the world, and the Smithsonian Institution's Global Volcanism Program (GVP).

Editions
The three editions of Volcanoes of the World were in 1981, 1994 and 2010 and are based on the GVP data and interpretations.

The subtitle of the second edition was A Regional Directory, Gazetteer, and Chronology of Volcanism during the last 10,000 years. It also identified the collaboration of Russell Blong, Johnathan Dehn, Christopher Newhall, Roland Pool, and Thomas C. Stein.

Tom Simkin, author involved with all three editions, was curator of Petrology and Volcanology at the National Museum of Natural History, as well as directing the Smithsonian's Global Volcanism Program between 1984 and 1994.  He died in 2009

Overview of previous summaries

The introduction in the second edition placed the text in context with previous books attempting to collate The Volcanoes of the World - as summaries in a range of languages, of global volcanic data back to Varenius in 1650.

 Varenius 1650
 Scrope   1825 
 Daubeny   1826 
 Van Hoff   1841
 Daubeny    1848 
 Landgrebe  1855 
 Scrope     1862 
 Fuchs      1865
 Humboldt   1869
 Mercalli   1907 
 Schneider  1911 
 Sapper     1917 
 CAVW       1951-75
 Katsui (ed) 1971
 Macdonald  1972
 Gushchenko 1979

Online version

A digital version of the text was released in 2002.

See also

Timeline of volcanism on Earth
Volcanic explosivity index
Volcano Number

References

External links
Global Volcanism Program
Global Volcanism Program Facebook page

Volcanology
Smithsonian Institution research programs
Works about volcanoes